The Battle of Shinohara occurred in 1183 during the Genpei War in Japan, in what is now Kaga city, Ishikawa prefecture.

History 
Following the Battle of Kurikara, Minamoto no Yoshinaka caught up with the retreating Taira no Munemori. An archery duel by champions on both sides preceded general fighting, which included several celebrated instances of single combat. Victory went to the Minamoto.  However, Yoshinaka's old retainer, Saito Sanemori, was a casualty.

See also
 Sanemori (Noh play)

References

1180s in Japan
1183 in Asia
Shinohara 1183
Shinohara